Joel or Yoel is a male given name derived from יוֹאֵל Standard Hebrew, Yoʾel, Tiberian Hebrew, or Yôʾēl, meaning "Yahu is god", "YHWH is God", or the modern translation "Yahweh is God".  Joel as a given name appears in the Hebrew Bible.

Joel as a given name

Biblical figures
 Joel, Jewish Biblical prophet
 Joel (biblical figure), several minor figures in the Hebrew Bible

Others
 Joel of Dotawo, Sudanese ruler 
 Joel Achenbach, American staff writer for The Washington Post and author
 Joel Anderson, California politician
 Joël Ayayi (born 2000), French basketball player
 Joel John Bailey, Canadian soccer player
 Joel Conrad Bakan, Canadian lawyer and writer
 Joel Barlow, American poet and politician
 Joel Barnett, Baron Barnett, British politician
 Joel Barr, American spy for the Soviet Union
 Joël Batteux (1943–2021), French politician
 Joel Beckett, English actor
 Joel Beinin, American historian of the Middle East
 Joel Benjamin, American chess grandmaster
 Joel Berghult, Swedish musician and YouTuber
 Joel Bomgar, American businessman and politician
 Joel Bouagnon, American football player
 Joël Bouchard, Canadian ice hockey player
 Joel Bowden, Australian rules footballer
 Joel Brand (1906–1964), Hungarian who had a prominent role in trying to save the Hungarian Jewish community
 Joel Breton, American game producer, DJ and entrepreneur
 Joel Brind, American scientist and anti-abortion activist
 Joel Brooks, American actor
 Joel Brutus, Haitian judoka
 Joel Carpenter, American screenwriter
 Joel Carreño, Dominican baseball player
 Joel Casamayor, Cuban boxer
 Joel Chan (actor), Hong Kong actor and singer
 Joel Chan (photographer), Singaporean photographer
 Joel Clinton, Australian rugby footballer
 Joel Coen, American director and producer
 Joel Connable, American news reporter, paramedic, and private pilot
 Joel Courtney, American actor
 Joel Crawford (film director), American story artist and film director
 Joel Crawford (politician) (1783–1858), American politician, soldier and lawyer
 Joel Crothers, American actor
 Joel Cummins, American musician
 Joel DeLisa, American physiatrist
 Joel Dorn, American music producer and record label entrepreneur
 Joel Edgerton, Australian actor
 Joel Ekelöf, Swedish vocalist of the band Soen
 Joel Embiid, Cameroonian basketball player
 Joel Engle, American recording artist
 Joel Erhardt, Commissioner of Police of New York City
 Joel Fabiani, American actor
 Joel Feinberg, American political and social philosopher
 Joel Fitzgibbon, Australian politician
 Joel Freeland, British basketball player
 Joël Fuchs, Swiss basketball player
 Joel Fuhrman, American physician and author
 Joel Garner, West Indian cricketer
 Joel Garreau, American journalist and author
 Joel Geist, American actor
 Joel Gerber, Chief Judge of the United States Tax Court
 Joel Gertner, American wrestling personality
 Joel Gion, American musician
 Joel Gistedt, Swedish ice hockey player
 Joel Glazer, part of the Glazer family
 Joel Glucksman (born 1949), American Olympic fencer
 Joel Godard, American television announcer
 Joel Goldsmith (1957–2012), American composer of film, television music and video games
 Joel S. Goldsmith (1892–1964), American author, teacher, spiritual healer, mystic and founder of the Infinite Way movement
 Joel Greenberg (historian) (born 1946), English educational technology consultant and historian
 Joel Greenberg (politician) (born 1984), American politician and former Florida tax collector
 Joel Greenblatt, American academic, hedge fund manager, investor, and writer
 Joel Gretsch, American actor
 Joel Grey, American actor
 Joel Hailey, American musician
 Joel Hanrahan, American baseball player
 Joel Chandler Harris, American journalist
 Joel Heath, American football player
 Joel Hefley, American politician
 Joel Heyman, American voice actor
 Joel Higgins, American actor and singer
 Joel Henry Hildebrand, American educator and a pioneer chemist
 Joel Hirschhorn, American songwriter
 Joel Hodgson, American creator of Mystery Science Theater 3000 and Joel Robinson, the character he plays on the show
 Joel Holmes (1821–1872), British soldier, recipient of the Victoria Cross
 Joel Horlen (1937–2022), American All Star baseball player 
 Joel Houston, Australian musician and songwriter, worship leader at the Hillsong Church
 Joel Hurt (1850–1926), American businessman and developer
 Joel Hyatt, American businessman, attorney and politician
 Joel Isasi, Cuban sprinter
 Joel Iyiegbuniwe (born 1995), American football player
 Joël Jeannot, French Olympic wheelchair racer
 Joel Jones, Puerto Rican basketball player
 Joel Kaplan, American political advisor
 Joel Kauffman, American stock car racer
 Joel Kinnaman, Swedish-American actor
 Joel Klein, Chancellor of the New York City Department of Education
 Joel Kovel, American politician, academic, writer and eco-socialist
 Joel Kramer (b. 1955), American basketball player
 Joel Kwiatkowski, Canadian ice hockey player
 Joel Landau, American entrepreneur, founder of The Allure Group
 Joel Landau (rabbi), American rabbi
 Joel Lane, British author, poet, critic and anthology editor
 Joel Lanning (born 1994), American football player
 Joël Le Tac (1918–2005), member of the Free French Forces (FFF) during the Second World War
 Joël Le Theule (1930–1980), French politician
 Joel Lebowitz (born 1930), American mathematical physicist
 Joel S. Levine, American planetary and atmospheric scientist
 Joel Löwe, German Biblical commentator
 Joel Luani, Australian rugby player
 Joel Lundqvist, Swedish ice hockey player
 Joel Lynch, British football player
 Joel Madden, American musician, lead vocalist for Good Charlotte
 Joel Dawit Makonnen, Ethiopian prince
 Joel Makower, American entrepreneur, writer, and strategist
 Joel Antônio Martins (1931–2003), Brazilian footballer known as "Joel"
 Joël Matip (born 1991), Cameroonian footballer
 Joel McCormack, American computer scientist
 Joel McCrea, American actor
 Joel McHale, American actor and host
 Joel McIlroy, Australian actor
 Joel McIver, British author
 Joel McNeely, American music composer for movies and television
 Joël Mergui (born 1958), French Jewish official
 Joel Meyerowitz, American photographer
 Joel Meyers, American sportscaster
 Joel David Moore, American actor
 Joel Moses, Israel-born American computer scientist
 Joel Müller, German rabbi
 Joel Murray, American actor
 Joel Myers, American businessman, founder, president and chairman of the board of AccuWeather, Inc.
 Joël Gustave Nana Ngongang, Cameroonian activist for LGBT human rights & HIV/AIDS in Africa
 Joel Oppenheimer, American poet
 Joel Osteen, American author, pastor, and televangelist
 Joel Otto, American ice hockey player
 Joel Palmer (1810–1881), American pioneer, author and politician
 Joel Parker (disambiguation), several people
 Joel Peralta, Dominican baseball player
 Joel Piñeiro, American baseball player
 Joel Plaskett, Canadian rock musician
 Joel Roberts Poinsett, American physician, botanist and diplomat
 Joel Porter, Australian football player
 Joel Primack, American professor of Astronomy and Astrophysics
 Joel Przybilla, American basketball player
 Joel Robles, Spanish football player
 Yoel Rodríguez (born 1988), Spanish footballer
 Joel Quarrington, Canadian bass player and soloist
 Joel Quenneville, Canadian former ice hockey defenceman, and coach of the NHL's Florida Panthers
 Joel Reddy, Australian Rugby League player
 Joel Rifkin, American serial killer
 Joel Augustus Rogers, Jamaican author, journalist and historian
 Yoel Romero, Cuban wrestler and mixed martial arts fighter
 Joel Rosenberg, Canadian-American science fiction and fantasy author
 Joel C. Rosenberg, American author and communications strategist
 Joel Ross, American tennis player
 Joel Roth, American rabbi in the Rabbinical Assembly
 Joel Salatin, American farmer, lecturer, and author
 Yoel Moshe Salomon (1838–1912), Ottoman newspaper publisher and co-founder of towns
 Joel Santana, Brazilian manager and former football player
 Joel Schumacher, American director and producer
 Joel Selwood, Australian Rules footballer
 Joel Shapiro, American sculptor
 Joel Shatzky (1943–2020), American writer and literary professor
 Joel Shepherd, Australian science fiction author
 Joel Sherman, American Scrabble expert
 Joel ibn Shu'aib, 15th-century rabbi from Aragon
 Joel Siegel, American film critic
 Joel Silbersher, musician from Australia
 Joel Silver, American film producer
 Joel Sirkis (1561–1640), Central European rabbi
 Joel Skinner, American baseball player and coach
 Joel Sonnenberg, Christian motivational speaker
 Joel Elias Spingarn, American educator and literary critic
 Yoel Sela (born 1951), Israeli Olympic competitive sailor
 Joel Spitzer (born c. 1957), American smoking cessation educator
 Joel Spolsky, American software engineer
 Joel Stebbins, American astronomer who pioneered photoelectric photometry in astronomy
 Joel Stein, American journalist
 Joel Steinberg, New York criminal defense attorney
 Joel Stelly, American football player for the Chicago, IL Bears
 Joel Sternfeld, American photographer
 Joel Stransky, South African rugby union footballer
 Joel Stroetzel, American guitarist from the Massachusetts metalcore band Killswitch Engage
 Joel Surnow, American writer and producer
 Joel Sweeney (1810–1860), American musician who popularized the banjo
 Joel Teitelbaum, Hungarian Hasidic Rabbi and Talmudic scholar
 Joel Thompson (politician), United States Representative from New York
 Joel Thompson (rugby league), Australian rugby league footballer
 Joel Tobeck, New Zealand film and television actor
 Joel Turner (musician), Australian musician
 Joel Veitch, English web animator and member of the B3ta collective
 Joel Vital, Portuguese footballer known as Joel
 Joël Voordewind (born 1965), Dutch politician
 Joel Ward (disambiguation), several people
 Joel Waterman (born 1996), Canadian soccer player
 Joel Wiener (born 1948/49), American billionaire real estate developer and landlord
 Joel Yanofsky, Canadian novelist and literary columnist
 Joel Youngblood, American Major League baseball player
 Joel Zifkin, Canadian musician and songwriter from Montreal, QC
 Joel Zimmerman, Canadian progressive house and electro house DJ better known as deadmau5
 Joel Zumaya, American Major League Baseball relief pitcher
 Joel Zwick, American director of movies, theatre, and television shows

Fictional characters
 Joel Barish, protagonist of the film Eternal Sunshine of the Spotless Mind, portrayed by Jim Carrey
 Joel Fleischman M.D., central character of the TV series Northern Exposure
 Joel Goodson, protagonist of the film Risky Business, portrayed by Tom Cruise
 Joel Hammond, a main character in Netflix series Santa Clarita Diet
 Joel Miller, protagonist of The Last of Us video game
 Joel Robinson, in the television series Mystery Science Theater 3000

English masculine given names
Masculine given names
Hebrew masculine given names
Jewish masculine given names
Modern names of Hebrew origin
Estonian masculine given names
Norwegian masculine given names
Spanish masculine given names
Swedish masculine given names
Theophoric names